G. Harold Wagner (July 19, 1900 – April 20, 1960) was an American politician from Pennsylvania who served as Pennsylvania State Treasurer and Pennsylvania State Auditor General.

Early life and education
Wagner was born in Drifton, Pennsylvania to George and Sallie (Kitchen) Wagner.  He attended the Mining and Mechanical Institute of Freeland, and graduated from Wilkes-Barre Business School.

During World War I, Wagner enlisted in the U.S. Navy, and served at the U.S. Naval Mine Depot in Yorktown, Virginia.

Career

Prior to entering politics, Wagner held clerical positions with two local railroads, and worked as editor and business manager for the Dallas Post newspaper in Dallas, Pennsylvania.

He served as Treasurer of Dallas, Pennsylvania, and as Deputy Clerk of Courts of Luzerne County; and he later headed the inheritance tax department of Luzerne County before his appointment as the county's property assessor in 1930.

Originally a Republican, Wagner switched to the Democratic Party in 1934, before seeking statewide office.

He served as Pennsylvania State Treasurer from 1941 to 1945 and as Pennsylvania State Auditor General from 1945 to 1949. In 1952, he unsuccessfully sought the Democratic nomination to the United States Senate to Guy K. Bard.

Personal life
Wagner was married to Madeline (Stroh) Wagner, with whom he had five children; to Carolyn (Bonomo) Wagner; and to Dorothy M. (Singer) Wagner, his wife at the time of his death.

After retirement from public life, Wagner moved to Florida where he was involved in real estate development in Ft. Lauderdale and Pompano Beach. He later moved to Black Mountain, North Carolina where he subdivided property and built homes until his death.

In 1960, Wagner suffered a heart attack and died at an Asheville, North Carolina hospital near Black Mountain.

His remains were interred at Freeland Cemetery in Freeland, Pennsylvania.

References

1900 births
1960 deaths
20th-century American politicians
Editors of Pennsylvania newspapers
Pennsylvania Auditors General
Pennsylvania Democrats
State treasurers of Pennsylvania
Pennsylvania Republicans